Moindou  is a commune in the South Province of New Caledonia, an overseas territory of France in the Pacific Ocean.

References

Communes of New Caledonia